Established in 1929, the South African Institute of Race Relations (SAIRR) is a research and policy organisation in South Africa. The institute is "one of the oldest liberal institutions in the country".

The institute investigates socioeconomic conditions in South Africa, and aims to address issues such as poverty and inequality, and to promote economic growth through promoting a system of limited government, a market economy, private enterprise, freedom of speech, individual liberty, property rights, and the rule of law. The SAIRR tracks trends in every area of South Africa's development, ranging from business and the economy to crime, living conditions, and politics.

History
The institute was founded in 1929. The inaugural meeting was held on 9 May 1929 in the Johannesburg home of the missionary Reverend Ray E. Phillips.  In attendance were Davidson Don Tengo Jabavu, one of the first professors at the University of Fort Hare; 
Johannes du Plessis, a missionary and theologian; Charles Templeman Loram, chief inspector of Native education in Natal Province; Edgar Brookes, J. Howard Pim, a government official; Thomas W. Mackenzie, editor of The Friend, a newspaper and J. H. Nicholson, Mayor of Durban. The IRR has run a bursary scheme since 1935. Nelson Mandela was awarded a bursary from the SAIRR in 1947 to complete his legal studies.

Controversies

In 2016, the IRR published a study whose results were critical towards South Africa's proposed Sugar Sweetened Beverage tax. Upon enquiry by journalists, it was revealed that the study was funded by Coca-Cola. IRR CEO Frans Cronje said that the IRR chose not to disclose this source of funding as "it was not at any stage considered exceptional, noteworthy or controversial". The IRR's public affairs officer Kelebogile Leepile said that the IRR intentionally approached groups who were likely to be negatively affected by the sugar tax and asked them to fund this research.

In December 2018, the IRR announced that it would be working with controversial cartoonist, Jeremy Talfer Nell, known as Jerm after he was fired by the civic organisation Organisation Undoing Tax Abuse for publishing a cartoon that discussed the link between race and IQ. The IRR defended their decision to hire Jerm by saying that even though the link between race and IQ has been disproved, Asian-Americans still outperform Americans of other races with regards to income and education levels despite historically being victims of racism, and called Jerm's firing “cowardly and disgraceful”. In May 2021, the IRR also fired Jerm.

In March 2019, the IRR was criticized for working with columnist David Bullard after they announced that they were hosting an event with him at Stellenbosch University. The IRR went on to hire Bullard as a columnist for their online publication The Daily Friend. Bullard had previously attracted controversy for referring to black people as "darkies". The IRR's head of media Michael Morris defended the decision to platform Bullard, citing freedom of speech. Morris said "It takes courage to be willing to be offended and reply with reason. That is what freedom means. Outlawing what might offend us only enfeebles and disables reason itself." 

In March 2020, David Bullard was fired from the IRR after he made a tweet defending the use of the racial slur kaffir.

In March 2019, the IRR called on lobby group AfriForum to retract a documentary that "seemingly sanitises the motives behind Apartheid and the brutality of its practices". When asked why AfriForum was listed as a funder in the IRR's 2015 and 2016 annual reports, as well as on their website, IRR CEO Frans Cronje stated "AfriForum have never funded the IRR. Someone put their name under funders in some of our documents and website which I only discovered once it was reported in the media."

On 1 June 2020, Cronje was forced to distance the IRR from comments made by one of its council members. IRR council member Unathi Kwaza tweeted: "Black people were better off under apartheid. It's time we admit this - at least those of us with honour." Cronje responded in a statement that "The broader IRR has always harboured a diversity of opinion among its structures and staff. However, the tweeted comment that apartheid was better than democracy does not accord with the position of the organisation or that of the great majority, almost without exception, of staff and office-bearers.".

Sponsors and Donors
The institute receives donations and funds from:
 Anglo American Chairman's Fund
 Elisabeth Bradley Trust
 FirstRand Foundation
 Friedrich Naumann Foundation for Freedom
 George Laurence
 Haggie Charitable Trust
 National Endowment for Democracy
 Johannes van der Horst
 Julian Ogilvie Thompson
 Oppenheimer Memorial Trust
 Peter Joubert
 Royal Belgian Embassy
 Trencor Services

References

External links
South African Institute of Race Relations

1929 establishments in South Africa
Think tanks based in South Africa
Foundations based in South Africa
African studies
Research institutes established in 1929
Civic and political organisations based in Johannesburg